Spider-Man (Peter Parker) is a superhero appearing in American comic books published by Marvel Comics. He is a modernized, alternate universe counterpart of Spider-Man who is in his youth, a superhero first created by Stan Lee and Steve Ditko in 1962. The Ultimate version of the character originated in Ultimate Marvel, a line of comic books created in 2000 that is set in a parallel universe with a narrative continuity separate and independent from the main continuity of Marvel Comics stories that began in the 1960s. Ultimate Spider-Man, the first and flagship title of the Ultimate line, was created by the writer Brian Michael Bendis and artist Mark Bagley, and debuted in September 2000, which featured the first appearance of the Ultimate version of the character. Based on the original Spider-Man who debuted from 1960s, he was bitten by a genetically-mutated spider, which gave him superhuman spider-abilities which led him to become a superhero as Spider-Man, to fight against crime after the tragedy of his late Uncle Ben. The biggest difference is that this version of Parker is killed at the age of 16, being Spider-Man for a span of almost a year before being replaced by the 13-year-old Miles Morales. However following the Secret Wars storyline, Miles and his family were retconned into the history of the prime universe and Peter who had been resurrected had resumed his superhero role. To differentiate him from other incarnations, Peter Parker from this universe is commonly dubbed Ultimate Spider-Man.

Fictional character biography 
At around the age of six, Peter Parker was orphaned after the death of his parents in a plane crash and was raised by his father's brother, Ben Parker, and his wife May. Nine years later, Peter grew to be an exceptionally bright teen and a high school genius, being particularly skilled in physics and chemistry. However, he was also an introverted outcast among his peers and was frequently bullied and tormented by Eugene "Flash" Thompson and Kenny "King Kong" McFarlane. On a school field trip to the scientific corporation Oscorp, he was bitten by a genetically-mutated spider, which gave him spider-like superhuman abilities. The head of Oscorp, Norman Osborn, discovered this and experimented with the same mutagen injected within the spider's bloodstream on himself, but the experiment went awry, mutating him into a monstrous, green-coloured and hulking goblin-like creature later known as the Green Goblin.

After discovering his new abilities, Peter used his powers for personal gain, like his standard counterpart, to financially support his family as a professional wrestler and to become popular by becoming the school's top basketball player thanks to his enhanced spider-powers. However, he began to selfishly utilise his abilities and started to act irresponsibly, which adversely affected his studies and behavior, all of which worried his aunt and uncle. Peter was later fired from his job as a wrestler under suspicions that he was responsible for a recent robbery, much to his chagrin and disappointment. Later that night, as he was walking to his house, he encountered an armed robber escaping from a nearby convenience store, but refused to stop him out of spite and continued to walk home. After returning home and having a heated argument with his aunt and uncle over his failing grades and increasingly reckless nature, Peter ran away from home out of anger. After regretting his argument with his aunt and uncle, he returned home intending to apologise and reveal his spider-powers to them, but upon arriving, he saw a police car and an ambulance parked outside his house, and to his horror, he discovered that Uncle Ben had been murdered by an armed thief. Fueled with rage and a thirst for vengeance, a masked Peter hunted down his uncle's killer. After cornering the criminal within an abandoned warehouse, Peter managed to subdue him and found out, to his shock, that the killer was the same robber whom he refused to stop earlier that night. He then handed over the killer to the arriving police. Guilt-ridden, Peter vowed to follow his uncle's motto, "with great power comes great responsibility", and became the masked vigilante Spider-Man in order to utilise his spider-powers for a noble purpose and to atone for his uncle's death.

In his first year as Spider-Man, Peter encountered the Green Goblin, who later disappeared into the river below the Brooklyn Bridge, following his defeat. Peter Parker later got a job as a web designer for the Daily Bugle upon being hired by J. Jonah Jameson, the snarky and cynical editor of the Daily Bugle, who disliked Spider-Man and constantly ran defamatory smear campaigns against the vigilante. Later, he confessed his identity to his classmate, crush and childhood friend: Mary Jane Watson and they formed a close romantic relationship. Peter Parker later met Gwen Stacy, which initially put pressure on Spider-Man's current relationship with Mary Jane Watson. This issue was later resolved and the three became good friends.

After being defeated by Spider-Man in a sudden reappearance, the Green Goblin was apprehended and incarcerated in the Triskelion alongside Doctor Octopus, Electro, Kraven the Hunter, and Sandman. They escaped from the Triskelion and formed the Ultimate Six. When the Green Goblin threatened to harm Aunt May, Spider-Man reluctantly allied with the Ultimate Six and they attacked the White House. When Captain America confirmed that Aunt May is safe, Spider-Man assisted the Ultimates in fighting the Ultimate Six.

In a later encounter with Nick Fury, Spider-Man learned that Nick Fury learned his secret identity upon finding evidence including footage of the spider that bit Peter Parker and the fact that Doctor Octopus was ranting in his cell about Peter Parker being Spider-Man.

During the "Ultimatum" storyline, Peter and those in his life survived the Ultimatum Wave caused by Magneto where Peter became Spider-Man to help save the drowning civilians. While Spider-Man was doing heroic acts, J. Jonah Jameson started publishing his heroic acts. While working with the Hulk, Spider-Man found the body of Daredevil, who became one of the casualties of the Ultimatum Wave. When the two of them arrived at the ruins of the Sanctum Sanctorum, Spider-Man and the Hulk found a rift open where Dormammu and different demons were emerging at the time when Doctor Strange was possessed by Nightmare. When the Hulk caused an explosion during the fight, Spider-Man was caught in the explosion. Following the death of Magneto, the Ultimates found Spider-Man unconscious while searching for survivors.

As Spider-Man was no longer having problems with the police following the Ultimatum Wave incident, Peter Parker had to take a temporary job at the Burger Frog when the Daily Bugle was temporarily shut down during the Ultimatum Wave incident.

During "The Death of Spider-Man" storyline, Spider-Man found that Norman Osborn had reformed the Ultimate Six with Vulture replacing Spider-Man. While searching for them following Doctor Octopus' death, Spider-Man threw himself in front of Captain America when he was targeted by Punisher and got shot. Upon dressing the wound, Spider-Man fought the Ultimate Six where they injured him further. Before Electro could attack Spider-Man, Aunt May shot him enough for him to discharge energy that knocked out Kraven the Hunter, Sandman, and Vulture. Spider-Man and the Green Goblin continued their fight which led to them mortally wounding each other. Before dying, Peter was surrounded by Aunt May, Mary Jane, the Human Torch, and Gwen Stacy as he quoted that he saved them where he was unable to save Uncle Ben. While Mary Jane cradled Spider-Man's lifeless body, she, Aunt May, and the Human Torch cried uncontrollably while Norman Osborn's dead body was seen with a smirk where he died knowing that he won.

During the "Ultimate Fallout" storyline, the public became aware of Peter Parker being Spider-Man as the Daily Bugle was the first to print the news about Spider-Man's death. When it came to his funeral, Tony Stark paid for the funeral while Captain America approached Aunt May, remorseful over the fact that he blamed himself for Spider-Man's death. Thor claimed that he saw Peter Parker's spirit in Valhalla. At the same time, an Afro-Latino boy named Miles Morales, who had developed powers before Peter even died and was now feeling guilty that he could have helped the latter, used a copy of the Spider-Man costume to defeat Kangaroo. Nick Fury even blamed himself for Spider-Man's death when he visited Mary Jane, who threatened to expose him.

Sometime later, under unknown circumstances, Peter awoke in an abandoned laboratory and made his way back to New York City where he reunited with Mary Jane. To investigate if he was still dead, they went to his grave to find that somebody dug his body out of his grave. Not wanting to surprise Aunt May, Peter went to retrieve his web-shooters from Miles Morales' apartment, only for Miles to enter his room. Both of them fought over the part of telling Aunt May, which led to a short scuffle ending with Peter knocking Miles out and making off with his web-shooters. After the also-resurrected Green Goblin ambushed Miles in Queens, Peter came to his aid, finally clad in his old costume. Peter's intervention on Green Goblin attempting to kill Miles surprised those who witnessed his return. It was discovered that the OZ Formula that affected Peter and Osborn had apparently given them virtual immortality. After Green Goblin was defeated, Detective Maria Hill shot him and immolated his body for good measure. Peter officially retired as Spider-Man and gave his web-shooters to Miles, as well as his blessing to uphold the Spider-Man mantle. Bidding farewell to Aunt May and Gwen, Peter and Mary Jane left New York to find out how he came back to life.

Following the Secret Wars storyline, the Ultimate Universe was restored and Peter Parker resumed the mantle of Spider-Man, as Miles now resided in the prime universe. After helping the Ultimates fight and detained the Green Goblin, Peter Parker attended a party that welcomed Kenny McFarland home from the army.

Powers, abilities and equipment

Powers and abilities 
After being bitten by a genetically-modified spider, the resulting aftermath led to the unseen side-effect of the spider-venom slowly killing Peter, before the effect eventually wore away and subsequently led him to develop arachnid-like superpowers.
So far, Spider-Man has been established as possessing:
 Van der Waals force abilities, which manifests through the ability to stick to and crawl on solid surfaces with his hands and feet, such as walls and trees.
 A sixth sense (dubbed "Spider-Sense") that alerts Spider-Man of unseen and incoming danger, which manifests through a sudden tingle in his skull.
 Augmented reflexes, agility, equilibrium and enhanced leaping abilities, along with an accelerated healing factor, which enables him to easily dodge bullets from a point blank range, balance himself by touching the ground with only one or two of his fingers, leap across tall buildings and heal from fatal injuries and wounds (E.g.-broken bones, skin burns, bullet wounds, bruises and bodily scars) at a much faster rate than that of a normal human, which usually takes days or weeks, depending on the severity of said injuries.
 Superhuman speed, strength, physicality, stamina, endurance, metabolism and durability, which manifests in him developing an enormous appetite, being able to outperform even trained Olympic-level athletes, withstand and survive brutal attacks and blows from super-human opponents and enables him to lift at least 10-15 tons. Although he is implied to be not as strong as his mainline counterpart, mostly due to his super-human abilities still maturing and developing, due to his young age, he has previously shown enough strength to pick up motor vehicles, such as cars and dockyard forklifts, knock out full-grown adults (non-superpowered ones) into a coma with a single blow (usually when angered) and even lift up and pummel the Green Goblin to death with a full-sized semi-truck, weighing over 50 tons.
 Limited immortality, Peter died after defeating the sinister six in the 'Death of Spider-Man' arc, but it is later revealed that the OZ formula has given him immortality, as he recovers from a gunshot wound & broken bones, all after dying & being buried.
After being bitten by the spider, Peter Parker created mechanical devices named "web-shooters", which produced a strong, web-like adhesive substance (much like his mainstream counterpart), by using his father's scientific notes, since the bite did not give him the ability to spin any webs.

Van der Waals force abilities 
Spider-Man gained the ability to adhere to any solid surface using his hands and feet because of van der Waals force, which depend on the interactions between his body and surfaces. His ability to stick to objects is seemingly unconscious – e.g., he accidentally pulled off pieces of plaster when having a heated argument with his aunt and uncle. He does not seem to have the ability to stick any part of him to walls other than his hands and feet, but it has not been officially revealed. Many characters find this ability of his disgusting, most namely Wolverine of the X-Men.

Spider-sense 
Spider-Man's most subtle power is his spider-sense. A form of precognition or sixth sense, it unconsciously activates and alerts him to any threat to himself, manifesting as an inexplicable tingle in the base of his skull. While it cannot tell him of the exact nature of the threat, it is vaguely directional and Spider-Man can judge the severity of the threat by the intensity of the tingling.

The spider-sense not only alerts Spider-Man to threats to his physical safety, but also helps him in web-swinging across the city and warns him to threats to his privacy, such as being observed while changing identities. Spider-Man also uses the spider-sense as a means to time his evasive maneuvers to the point where he can easily avoid gunfire. When combined with his superhuman reflexes and agility, this makes him an extremely difficult target to shoot in combat and formidable in close quarters.

Unlike in the official continuity, Peter can be sneaked up on as long as whoever is sneaking up on him means no harm. This is revealed when the Black Cat sneaks up on him from behind and covers his eyes. He rarely refers to it as a "Spider-Sense", although he has referred to it as such on occasion.

Wavy lines emanating from Peter's head often show the activation of the spider-sense; sometimes the whole panel is completely red-tinted (as it is in the first time he uses it). Also, Venom has shown the ability to overload Spidey's Spider-Sense, or avoid it completely, like in normal mainstream continuity.

Scientific aptitude and knowledge 
Apart from his physical abilities, Peter is an intellectually-gifted scientific teen genius and has a prodigious aptitude in the physical sciences, with a high IQ level of around 250. He has a facility for chemistry and physics, and while he is depicted as less intellectually-skilled than his mainstream counterpart, he is still considered to be exceptionally bright and intelligent in his own right, impressing the likes of Tony Stark and Reed Richards. He designed his self-devised web-shooters, but the adhesive formula was one his father had been working on, which he managed to crack and is usually depicted as the brightest student in his class. Spending years throughout his fighting experience, he's able to perform martial arts and hand-to-hand combat skills that are most reliable to his spider powers.

Equipment 
Although he is of limited financial means, Spider-Man has developed personal equipment that plays an important role in his superhero career.

Web-shooters 
Spider-Man's web-shooters are the character's most distinguishing trait. They are wrist-mounted devices that fire a fibrous adhesive very similar to the material spiders use to construct webs. The trigger rests high in the palm but does not require a double tapping from the middle and ring fingers to activate, unlike in the official continuity. It requires only one tap, but somehow he has found a way not to hit it when making a fist.

His late father worked on the formula for the webbing itself. After fighting crime for a whole night, Peter finally solved the formula and used it to create his own webs. At this stage, Peter does not seem to be able to shoot different types of webbing, only one, though neither did the main Marvel continuity Parker for the first few years of his career. He has, on the other hand, shown the ability to not stick to his own webbing and have approximately enough webbing to fill up a living room.

In other media

Television 
 Before Spider-Man: The New Animated Series became a loose continuation of Sam Raimi's 2002 Spider-Man film, the series was originally going to be a direct adaptation of the Ultimate Spider-Man comics, with Brian Michael Bendis as a producer.
 The Spectacular Spider-Man took several elements from the Ultimate comics, such as Peter Parker and his friends being teenagers in high school for the majority of the series, his personal relationship with Eddie Brock, and Spider-Man bonding with the Venom symbiote while it was kept in a secured lab.
 An unrelated animated series of the same name aired in the United States on Disney XD from April 2012 to January 2017. Despite this, the series' version of Peter Parker bears a striking resemblance to the comic book version. Additionally, the four-part episode "The Spider-Verse" featured a variation of the Ultimate universe, in which its Peter Parker had died fighting Ultimate Goblin. while his mantle was long since taken up by a guilt-ridden Miles Morales. Furthermore, Gwen Stacy was also a close friend of his before she eventually became Spider-Gwen. Additionally, the show’s version of Green Goblin heavily resembles the Ultimate incarnation, though borrows elements from the original Goblin such as armour and a glider. A version of Green Goblin, specified to be the Ultimate Goblin, lives in Miles Morales’ universe as well. Also, instead of Eddie Brock, Harry Osborn is the host for the Venom symbiote, taking the form of Spider-Man's black suit as Spider-Man does not bond with it.

Film
 Sam Raimi's film Spider-Man (2002) uses elements from the Ultimate comics, such as Peter Parker and Harry Osborn being friends in high school and the latter protecting the former from bullies, Parker being bitten by a genetically-altered spider during a school field trip and him letting a burglar escape due to his disappointment after participating in a wrestling exhibit.
 Marc Webb's film The Amazing Spider-Man (2012) adopts many elements from the Ultimate comics, such as Peter Parker's angst-ridden personality, being bitten by a genetically-altered spider at Oscorp, storming off from a conversation with his Uncle Ben about his father Richard Parker and the importance of responsibility, Peter letting a thief steal from a convenience store, and Gwen Stacy dating Peter during high school.
 In the sequel The Amazing Spider-Man 2 (2014), Peter discovers an old recording of Richard on a computer inside an abandoned subway station lab, which explains why he had to leave Peter at a young age and his fears that his research will fall into the wrong hands. While Richard created Venom as a cure for cancer in the comics, the film depicts him creating the mutated spiders that would go on to give Peter his powers. Furthermore, Peter's friendship with Harry Osborn is also modeled after that of his and Eddie Brock Jr.'s, being childhood friends who had not seen each other in a long time and whose fathers worked together before Norman Osborn betrayed Richard. 
 The Marvel Cinematic Universe film Spider-Man: Homecoming (2017) adapts several elements from the Ultimate comics, such as a more conventionally youthful Peter Parker and Aunt May. Tony Stark / Iron Man, whose personality is also adapted from the Ultimate comics, serves as a mentor figure for Peter like in the comics, though here it becomes familial. Aaron Davis is involved in criminal activities as in the comics, Miles Morales is alluded to, and Peter's best friend Ned Leeds is modeled after Morales' best friend Ganke Lee.
 In the sequel Spider-Man: Far From Home (2019), Nick Fury adopts a mentor role towards Peter like in the comics while Peter's classmate MJ, who is inspired by Mary Jane Watson, deduces his identity like her and only confirms her suspicion once he indirectly reveals it to her.
 A version of Spider-Man meant to invoke the Ultimate Marvel version appears in the Sony Pictures Animation film Spider-Man: Into the Spider-Verse (2018), voiced by Chris Pine. Unlike the comics, this Peter Parker is blonde, lived into his mid-20s, married Mary Jane Watson, and licensed his likeness to merchandising to provide funds for his superheroics, allowing him to build an underground lair beneath his house to fashion tools and spare costumes. During a battle with the Green Goblin and Prowler, he gives a flash drive containing a kill code for the Kingpin's Super-Collider to Miles Morales before being trapped under rubble and dying at Kingpin's hands. Following this, Morales is eventually galvanized into becoming the new Spider-Man. Additionally, the movie features the Aaron Davis incarnation of Prowler, and him and Miles’ relationship is adapted directly from the comics. The ultimate version of Green Goblin appears in the sense that Green Goblin is a large monster, but otherwise other elements are adapted from his original/MC2 incarnation. Kingpin’s storyline mimics his Ultimate one in some ways, though his appearance is inspired by his interpretation in later Daredevil comics.

Video games
 Ultimate Peter Parker / Spider-Man appears on the instructions booklet pages in Spider-Man 2: Enter Electro.
 Elements of Ultimate Peter Parker / Spider-Man and the comic book are used in the Spider-Man film tie-in game. 
 Ultimate Peter Parker / Spider-Man appears in a self-titled video game, voiced by Sean Marquette.
 Ultimate Peter Parker / Spider-Man appears as a playable character in Spider-Man: Battle for New York, voiced by James Arnold Taylor.
 Ultimate Peter Parker / Spider-Man appears as a playable character in Spider-Man: Toxic City.
 Ultimate Peter Parker / Spider-Man appears as a playable character in Spider-Man: Shattered Dimensions, voiced by Josh Keaton. Madame Web grants him his symbiote costume and uses her telepathic powers to keep it from taking over so he can retrieve fragments of the Tablet of Order and Chaos from his universe's versions of Electro, Deadpool, and Carnage more effectively before joining forces with three of his alternate counterparts to stop Mysterio after he claims the reassembled tablet. This section is not included in the Nintendo DS version.
 Ultimate Peter Parker / Spider-Man appears as a playable character in Ultimate Spider-Man: Total Mayhem, voiced by Andrew Chaikin.
 Elements of Ultimate Peter Parker / Spider-Man and his universe are incorporated into Marvel's Spider-Man.

Miscellaneous
An amalgamated incarnation of Spider-Man based on his Ultimate and mainstream appears in an interactive attraction built in Niagara Falls as part of "Marvel Superhero Adventure City". His appearance is based on his Ultimate version, but he is more experienced like his mainstream counterpart.

Reception
Brian Michael Bendis' modernized re-imagining of Peter Parker/Spider-Man has been met with a widely positive response from fans and critics, with many considering the Ultimate Marvel version of Spider-Man to be the one of best modern interpretations of Spider-Man and has even influenced other non-comic Spider-Man adaptations in the television, video game and cinematic mediums. Many critics and fans praised Ultimate Peter Parker/Spider-Man as a fresh, unique and distinctively contemporary, but familiar and faithful twist on the classic Spider-Man mythos, being called as a well-rounded and likable, but also vulnerable, humanly flawed and struggling everyman teen hero, with a commendable character-arc from being a selfish, angry teen who irresponsibly uses his super-powers for his own personal gain to a more heroic and altruistic figure as Spider-Man and accepting his new life as a solo teen superhero and the consequences and negative side-effects that comes from it, his relatable struggles, internal conflicts, the constant mental self-doubts about his responsibilities as a superhero and his struggles with said responsibility and the realistic depiction of how being a super-hero would negatively affect an individual's life and his relations with his close ones, similar to Stan Lee and Steve Ditko's original depiction of Spider-Man in the early 1960s Spider-Man comic-books.

References

External links 
 Spider-Man of Earth-1610 at Marvel Wiki

Alternative versions of Spider-Man
Fictional basketball players
Fictional characters from New York City
Fictional characters with superhuman durability or invulnerability
Marvel Comics characters who can move at superhuman speeds
Marvel Comics characters with accelerated healing
Fictional characters with precognition
Marvel Comics characters with superhuman strength
Marvel Comics mutates
Marvel Comics orphans
Marvel Comics scientists
S.H.I.E.L.D. agents
Superheroes who are adopted
Teenage superheroes
Ultimate Marvel characters
Vigilante characters in comics